Duvaucelia plebeia, common name the European nudibranch, is a species of sea slug, a nudibranch, a marine gastropod mollusk in the family Tritoniidae.

Description 
The color is primarily yellow, with brown mottling. The length of this nudibranch is up to 30 mm.

Distribution 
The indigenous distribution of Duvaucelia plebeia is the Northeastern Atlantic Ocean from Norway to Portugal.

The species has been introduced in coastal areas of Maine and Massachusetts, probably in ballast water from ships.

Ecology

Habitat 
This is a marine species.

Feeding habits 
Although this species was introduced in the Gulf of Maine only during the mid-1980s, it has had a severe impact on the soft coral, Alcyonium siderium.

References 
This article incorporates public domain text (a public domain work of the United States Government) from reference.

External links 

 http://www.seaslugforum.net/tritpleb.htm
 

Tritoniidae
Gastropods described in 1828
Taxa named by George Johnston (naturalist)